Pope Palace is a palace in Pope parish, an administrative unit of the Ventspils municipality in the historical region of Courland, in western Latvia. It was originally built in 1653 for the von Behr family, but was extensively remodeled in 1720 and 1840. Since 1920 the building has housed the Pope primary school.

See also
List of palaces and manor houses in Latvia

References

External links
 Pope Palace
 

Palaces in Latvia
Windau County
Ventspils Municipality